St Augustine's Church is a Victorian Church of England parish church in Slade Green, in the Diocese of Rochester.

Established as a daughter of the Church of St Paulinus, Crayford in 1900, St Augustine's became its own parish in 1925. The church is dedicated to the patron saint Augustine of Canterbury. A prominent war memorial has stood at the front of the church since at least 1930.

St Augustine's was subject to air raids during both world wars. The church received families from the east of London that had been 'bombed out' during the Second World War. The local community was supported during the war by a British Restaurant operating from St. Augustine's Church Hall, which supplied up to 250 lunches six days a week to residents, the school, and nearby factories. Substantial rebuilding work was required following a direct hit during an air raid in 1944, and following a fire in 1991 which destroyed the roof and much of the internal fabric.

References

External links 
 St Augustine's, Slade Green, London Borough of Bexley
 Slade Green – St Augustine of Canterbury

Church of England church buildings in the London Borough of Bexley
Diocese of Rochester
Churches completed in 1900
20th-century Church of England church buildings
Churches bombed by the Luftwaffe in London